Greg Nesbitt is a Canadian provincial politician, who was elected as the Member of the Legislative Assembly of Manitoba for the riding of Riding Mountain currently serving as the Minister of Natural Resources and Northern Development. in the 2016 election. He is a member of the Progressive Conservative party, and held the seat after incumbent MLA Leanne Rowat did not stand for re-election. He was re-elected in the 2019 election.

References 

Living people
21st-century Canadian politicians
Progressive Conservative Party of Manitoba MLAs
Year of birth missing (living people)